This is a list of Arena Football League seasons since the league started in 1987.

1980s
1987 | 1988 | 1989

1990s
1990 | 1991 | 1992 | 1993 | 1994 | 1995 | 1996 | 1997 | 1998 | 1999

2000s
2000 | 2001 | 2002 | 2003 | 2004 | 2005 | 2006 | 2007 | 2008 | 2009

2010s
2010 | 2011 | 2012 | 2013 | 2014 | 2015 | 2016 | 2017 | 2018 | 2019

2020s
2024

See also
 ArenaBowl

Notes
1. The Arena Football League suspended operations in 2009, and no season took place.

References

 
Seasons